Stephen Augustus Hurlbut (November 29, 1815 – March 27, 1882), was an attorney and politician, who commanded the U.S. Army of the Gulf in the American Civil War. Afterward, he continued to serve as a politician and also as a diplomat.

Although born and educated in the South, his parents were from the North and his father was a Unitarian minister. After passing the bar, Hurlbut moved at the age of 30 to Illinois to set up a practice. There he married and had a family.

When war broke out, he supported the Union and Republican Party. Hurlbut was present at the Battle of Shiloh and served under General Sherman during the Meridian Expedition.

After the war, he returned to politics. He served in various capacities, being appointed as Minister to Colombia and elected as a U.S. Congressman from Illinois.

Early life
Hurlbut was born in 1815 in Charleston, South Carolina to Martin Luther Hurlbut and Lydia Bunce, who were from the North. His father was a Unitarian minister and educator. He had been president of Beaufort College in South Carolina from 1812–1814. Hurlbut studied law with James L. Petigru as his mentor, worked for him as a law clerk, and was admitted to the South Carolina Bar in 1837. During the Second Seminole War, he served as adjutant of a South Carolina infantry regiment.

In 1845, Hurlbut moved north to Illinois, a free state. He established a law practice in Belvidere. He started his own family in 1847 after marrying Sophronia R. Stevens; they had two children together.

In 1847, Hurlbut took part in the Illinois constitutional convention as a Whig delegate. He served as a presidential elector for the Whig Party in the 1848 Presidential Election, and became acquainted with Abraham Lincoln during campaigning for Old Rough and Ready Zachary Taylor.

He was elected to the Illinois House of Representatives in 1859, and re-elected in 1861.

Hurlbut campaigned for Lincoln during the presidential election in 1860, and attended Lincoln's first inauguration on March 4, 1861. He and Colonel Ward H. Lamon performed a fact-finding mission at Lincoln's request, and visited Charleston on March 24–26, 1861, to investigate and report, "the actual state of feeling in this City & State." Lamon received a separate assignment from William H. Seward to visit Fort Sumter.

On March 27, 1861, Hurlbut wrote a detailed report in which he stated,

Civil War

When the Civil War erupted, Hurlbut joined the Union Army. He was commissioned as a brigadier general, U.S. Volunteers, on May 17, 1861, and a major general on September 17, 1862.

He commanded the 4th Division, Army of the Tennessee at the Battle of Shiloh, and in the advance towards Corinth and the subsequent siege. He also led a division at the Battle of Hatchie's Bridge, taking command of the entire Union force after Gen Edward Ord was wounded.

Hurlbut commanded XVI Corps from his headquarters at Memphis, Tennessee. Historian Bertram Korn has suggested that, during Hurlbut's garrison duty at Memphis, Tennessee, the brigadier general issued antisemitic orders confiscating Jewish property and preventing Jews from trading.

Hurlbut led a corps under William T. Sherman in the 1864 Meridian expedition. He subsequently commanded the Department of the Gulf, succeeding Nathaniel P. Banks and serving in that capacity for the remainder of the war. Hurlbut was suspected of embezzlement during his term. General Edward R. S. Canby ordered a court-martial proceeding and the arrest of Hurlbut. However, he was allowed to resign in June 1865.

Postwar years
After mustering out of the Union Army on June 20, 1865, Hurlbut became one of the founding fathers of the Grand Army of the Republic. He served as commander-in-chief from 1866 to 1868.

He was appointed Minister Resident to Colombia in 1869, where he served three years. In 1872, Hurlbut was elected to the U.S. House of Representatives (R-Illinois). Re-elected for a second term in 1874, he was defeated in 1876.

Hurlbut was appointed as ambassador to Peru in 1881. In that capacity he had a row with General Hugh Judson Kilpatrick, U.S. minister to Chile during the War of the Pacific. Each man had become a partisan of the country to which he was assigned to represent Hurlbut continued to serve as U.S. ambassador to Peru until his death in Lima in 1882.

His body was returned to Belvidere, Illinois for burial. Hurlbut and his wife are buried together in Belvidere Cemetery, Belvidere, Illinois.

See also

List of American Civil War generals (Union)
 William Henry Hurlbert

Notes
According to Donald T. Phillips, author of Lincoln on Leadership (1992), Hachette Book Group, N.Y., N.Y., Stephen A. Hurlbut was "one of his (Lincoln's) trusted colleagues." Lincoln sent him "on a fact-finding mission to Charleston .... to meet with the Confederate leaders, evaluate the situation (i.e., the crisis developing over Ft. Sumter) and report back...." "War, according to Hurlbut, was inevitable, unless the South was allowed to secede." As a result of this report, "Lincoln decided to resupply the embattled fort; if his ships were fired upon, it would be the Confederacy that started the war, not the Union."

References

Further reading
 Lash, Jeffrey N., A Politician Turned General: the Civil War Career of Stephen Augustus Hurlbut. Kent, Ohio; London: Kent State University Press, 2003.   
 Sager, Juliet Gilman, and Harry G. Hershenson. Stephen A. Hurlbut, 1815–1882. Springfield: Illinois State Historical Society, 1935. 

Attribution

External links

 

1815 births
1882 deaths
Politicians from Charleston, South Carolina
Union Army generals
Members of the Illinois House of Representatives
People of Illinois in the American Civil War
People from Belvidere, Illinois
1848 United States presidential electors
19th-century American diplomats
Illinois Whigs
Republican Party members of the United States House of Representatives from Illinois
Grand Army of the Republic Commanders-in-Chief
19th-century American politicians
Ambassadors of the United States to Colombia
Ambassadors of the United States to Peru